The 1948 Major League Baseball season was contested from April 19 to October 11, 1948. The Boston Braves and Cleveland Indians were the regular season champions of the National League and American League, respectively. The Indians won the American League title via a tie-breaker game victory over the Boston Red Sox, after both teams finished their 154-game schedules with identical 96–58 records. The Indians then defeated the Braves in the World Series, four games to two.

Awards and honors
Baseball Hall of Fame
Herb Pennock
Pie Traynor
Most Valuable Player
Lou Boudreau (AL)
Stan Musial (NL)
Rookie of the Year
Alvin Dark
The Sporting News Player of the Year Award
Lou Boudreau Cleveland Indians
The Sporting News Pitcher of the Year Award
Bob Lemon Cleveland Indians
Johnny Sain Boston Braves
The Sporting News Manager of the Year Award
Billy Meyer Pittsburgh Pirates

Standings

American League

National League

  The Cleveland Indians defeated the Boston Red Sox in a one-game playoff to earn the American League pennant.

Postseason

Bracket

League leaders

American League

National League

Managers

American League

National League

Home Field Attendance

See also
1948 All-American Girls Professional Baseball League season

References

External links
1948 Major League Baseball season schedule at Baseball Reference

 
Major League Baseball seasons